Indian Society for Parasitology is a non profit making registered society formed under the aegis of the Central Drug Research Institute, Lucknow, working as a platform for the parasitologists in India for dissemination of knowledge and exchange of research information. The society is affiliated to the World Federation of Parasitologists.

Profile
Indian Society for Parasitology was established as a registered society under the Indian Societies Act in 1973. The organization serves as a platform for the parasitologists, researchers, biologists and academicians involved in the field of Parasitology related to humans and animals for promoting their activities, exchanging information and disseminating knowledge on the subject. The society has 700 life members and several Fellows honored under its Fellowship program. It is located in the CDRI campus in Lucknow, in the Indian state of Uttar Pradesh.

The society is run by an elected committee and is headed by a president and a secretary; S. L. Hoti and J. K. Saxena being the incumbent office bearers. They organize annual conferences where keynote addresses, award lectures, presentation of research papers, guest lectures and symposia are featured. Workshops and training sessions are also organized regularly for the benefit of young scientists working in Parasitology. The society was the host of the second Global Meet on Parasitology, held at Hyderabad in 1997.

ISP has instituted two oration awards, B. N. Singh Memorial Oration and B. P. Pandey Memorial Oration for honoring excellence in research and teaching respectively. It has also put in place annual awards such as Young Scientist Award and M. B. Mirza Award for excellence in research paper presentation and publication.

The society, besides a quarterly newsletter, publishes a bi-annual journal, Journal of Parasitic Diseases (JPD), the services of which are offered to scientists for publishing their research papers.

Fellows of the institute
List of Fellows of the institute updated to 2010

See also
 Parasitology

References

External links
 

Scientific organisations based in India
1973 establishments in India
Organisations based in Lucknow
Parasitology